Birth Control (also known as The New World) is a lost 1917 American documentary film produced by and starring Margaret Sanger and describing her family planning work. It was the first film banned under the 1915 ruling of the United States Supreme Court in Mutual Film Corporation v. Industrial Commission of Ohio, which held that the exhibition of films did not constitute free speech.

The banning of Birth Control was upheld by the New York Court of Appeals on the grounds that a film on family planning may be censored "in the interest of morality, decency, and public safety and welfare."

See also
Film censorship in the United States
List of lost films

References

External links

1917 films
American black-and-white films
Birth control
Works subject to a lawsuit
Documentary films about health care
1917 documentary films
Black-and-white documentary films
Films about activists
Family planning
American silent feature films
Lost American films
American documentary films
Obscenity controversies in film
1910s English-language films
1910s American films